Lorenzo Asprella (1538–1605) was a Roman Catholic prelate who served as Bishop of Massa Lubrense (1594–1605).

Biography
Lorenzo Asprella was born in Tursien. On 19 December 1594, he was appointed during the papacy of Pope Clement VIII as Bishop of Massa Lubrense.
He served as Bishop of Massa Lubrense until his death in 1605.

See also 
Catholic Church in Italy

References

External links and additional sources
 (for Chronology of Bishops) 
 (for Chronology of Bishops) 

1538 births
1605 deaths
16th-century Italian Roman Catholic bishops
17th-century Italian Roman Catholic bishops
Bishops appointed by Pope Clement VIII